The Alas de Oros (Spanish for "Wings of Gold") is an annual professional wrestling tournament held by the Mexican professional wrestling promotion Lucha Libre AAA World Wide (AAA). The tournament features young high-fliers, hence the "Wings of Gold" moniker, who are either low-card or mid-card workers at the time of the tournament. The "Alas de Oro" title is not defended outside the tournament like AAA's Reina de Reinas title is. The tournament was created in 2007 and saw Extreme Tiger win the first Alas de Oro, in 2008 Aero Star won the tournament.

Alas de Oro 2007
The first Alas de Oro tournament featured an eight-man elimination match where two wrestlers were in the ring at the same time while the remaining competitors stayed on the floor. If a wrestler was eliminated or left the ring a wrestler from the outside could enter the ring to continue the match. The tournament took place on July 27, 2007 and included Real Fuerza Aérea (Laredo Kid, Pegasso, Rey Cometa, Aero Star and Super Fly), Hombre sin Miedo, Extreme Tiger and Escoria. Escoria was the sole Rudo (Heel or bad guy) in the match. Extreme Tiger won the match eliminating Super Fly as the last competitor. Extreme Tiger was the competitor with the most eliminations, three (Super Fly, Hombre Sin Miedo and Laredo Kid).

Alas de Oro 2008
The 2008 version of Alas de Oro was held on August 8, 2008 and this year included nine wrestlers in the same elimination match format that was used for the 2007 event. There were four wrestlers from the 2007 match that also participated in the 2008 version, including the previous winner Extreme Tiger as well as Aero Star, Escoria and Super Fly. In the 2008 event there was a more balanced Tecnico/Rudo mix than in 2007 as Rudos Jack Evans and Teddy Hart competed alongside Último Gladiador, El Ángel and Gato Eveready. Extreme Tigre was eliminated second to last, just before Aero Star pinned Jack Evans to win the match. During the pinfall Jack Evans kicked out for a controversial finish. A rematch a few weeks later saw Aero Star get a clean, decisive victory over Evans to eliminate any doubt about who won the Alas de Oro.

References

External links
Official Website
AAA at Galavisión

Lucha Libre AAA Worldwide tournaments
Lucha Libre AAA Worldwide shows
Recurring events established in 2007
Recurring events disestablished in 2008